Saroja, is a 2000 Sri Lankan Sinhalese children's drama film directed by Somaratne Dissanayake as maiden feature film and produced by his wife Renuka Balasuriya. It stars two child artists Pramudi Karunarathne and Nithyavani Kandasami in lead roles along with Janaka Kumbukage and Joe Abeywickrama. Music composed by Rohana Weerasinghe. It is the 931st film in Sri Lankan cinema. The film is a hugely successful film that has won awards and critical acclaim worldwide.

Plot 
Saroja is a little Tamil girl. Her father is a rebel and one day their home is burnt, and Saroja's mother is dead. Due to the army attacking Saroja's father is wounded and they run away to the jungle. They enter an adjoining Sinhala village.

The father and daughter meet Varuni, the little daughter of the village school teacher. Varuni is also of the same age as Saroja, but they cannot understand each other due to the language barrier.

But gradually a strong bond of friendship between them builds up. Varuni pleads with her parents and with much difficulty succeeds in providing accommodation for Saroja in their home. Later Saroja's father is also given shelter in the house.

However, suspicions arise among Police and Army officers resulting in the family being subject to various types of obstacles from the forces. Suddenly Saroja's father is killed.

Varuni's father is given a punishment transfer to another remote village school. The family too leaves, the village along with Saroja who is now treated as a family member

Cast
 Nithyavani Kandasami as Saroja
 Pramudi Karunarathne as Varuni 
 Janaka Kumbukage as Punchibanda, Varuni's father
 Mervyn Mahesan as Sundaralingam, Saroja's father 
 Nita Fernando as Varuni's mother
 Susantha Chandramali as Nurse
 Sampath Tennakoon as Police Chief
 Mahendra Perera as Sirisena
 Asoka Peiris as Boutique owner
 Ranjini Rajamohan as Saroja's mother
 Mahinda Pathirage
 Winnie Wettasinghe
 Lalith Janakantha
 Tony Ranasinghe as guest artist
 Ravindra Randeniya as guest artist Major Fernando

Reception
The film was chosen to represent the competitive section of the International Film Festival commenced in Dhaka on 20 January 2000. The film won the Audience Award Dhaka International Film Festival held on 28 January 2000. It also shared the NETPAC Award for the Best Asian Film with fellow Sri Lankan film Padadaya directed by Linton Semage.

The film was also selected to compete at the 33rd Annual Worlfest-Houston International Film Festival at the public screening section of the festival from 7 to 16 April 2000. At the festival, Saroja won Bronze award in competitive section.

Awards
 Audience award (Best film) - Dhaka International Film Festival (Bangladesh) 2000
 Best Asian Film (Netpac Award) - Dhaka International Film Festival (Bangladesh) 2000
 Bronze Award Independent Theatrical Feature Films - First Feature - Houston International Film Festival (USA) 2000
 Special Award of the Festival - Pyongyang International Film Festival (Korea) 2000
 Best Director - Iran International Film Festival (Isfahan - Iran) 2000
 Best Performance (Pramudi & Nithyavani) - Iran International Film Festival (Isfahan - Iran) 2000
 LivUllmann Peace Award - Chicago International Film Festival (USA) 2000
 Audience Award -Vesoul International Film Festival (France) 2000

References

External links

2000 films
Films set in Sri Lanka (1948–present)
Films about the Sri Lankan Civil War